An internalnet is a computer network composed of devices inside and on the human body. Such a system could be used to link nanochondria, bionic implants, wearable computers, and other devices.

See also
Nanomedicine
Personal area network

External links
PC Magazine definition
Smart computing

Bionics
Computer networks by scale
Implants (medicine)